The Los Angeles class of submarines are nuclear-powered fast attack submarines (SSN) in service with the United States Navy. Also known as the 688 class (pronounced "six-eighty-eight") after the hull number of lead vessel , 62 were built from 1972 to 1996, the latter 23 to an improved 688i standard. As of 2022, 26 of the Los Angeles class remain in commission—more than any other class in the world—and they account for more than half of the U.S. Navy's 50 fast attack submarines.

Rickover's response to the decision to name the submarines after cities (and occasionally politicians influential in defense issues) was that "Fish don't vote."

Development 
In the late 1960s, the Soviet Union's advances in submarine technology increasingly threatened the survivability of US Navy (USN) carrier battle groups. Soviet fast-attack submarines became capable of keeping pace with carrier groups, while their newer missile submarines could potentially overwhelm the group's defenses with salvos of missiles. Development of the Los Angeles class commenced in 1967 as a response. The class originally had essentially the same weapons and sensors than the preceding Sturgeon-class submarine, but was approximately 50% larger with "major improvements" in stealth and speed so that they too could keep up with carrier battle groups.

On 1 December 1976 General Dynamics Electric Boat (GDEB) submitted a $544 million claim related to its contract for 18 Los-Angeles-class submarines; the contractor alleged the USN made an undue amount of design changes while the government argued that Electric Boat mismanaged its operations. The USN and General Dynamics reached an $843 million settlement agreement in June 1978; the contract price was increased by $125 million, GDEB absorbed a $359 million loss, and the USN paid an additional $359 million under the authority of Public Law 85-804. The USN and General Dynamics had a further dispute in 1979–1980 when it was discovered that nonconforming steel had been used in the construction of the submarines and thousands of welds were found to either defective or missing. This lead General Dynamics to file a $100 million insurance claim to cover the costs of re-inspections of the yard's work, "thus, Electric Boat was asking the Navy to reimburse it for its own mis-management." The parties reached an agreement in 1981 whereby GDEB was awarded a firm contract for an additional 688-class boat and two options; the Navy needed GDEB's shipbuilding capacity to achieve its procurement goals.

Los Angeles-class submarines were built in three successive flights:

Design

Flights

In 1982, after building 31 boats, the class underwent a minor redesign. The following eight that made up the second "flight" of subs had 12 new vertical launch tubes that could fire Tomahawk missiles. The last 23 had a significant upgrade with the 688i improvement program. These boats are quieter, with more advanced electronics, sensors, and noise-reduction technology. The diving planes are placed at the bow rather than on the sail, and are retractable. A further four boats were proposed by the Navy, but later cancelled.

Capabilities

Although Tyler cites the 688-class design committee for this figure, the government has not commented on it. The maximum diving depth is  according to Jane's Fighting Ships, 2004–2005 Edition, edited by Commodore Stephen Saunders of the Royal Navy.

Weapons

Los Angeles-class submarines carry about 25 torpedo tube-launched weapons, as well as Mark 67 and Mark 60 CAPTOR mines and were designed to launch Tomahawk cruise missiles, and Harpoon missiles horizontally (from the torpedo tubes). The last 31 boats of this class (Flight II and Flight III/688i) also have 12 dedicated vertical launching system tubes for launching Tomahawks. The tube configuration for the first two boats of Flight II differed from the later ones: Providence and Pittsburgh have four rows of three tubes vs. the inner two rows of four and outer two rows of two tubes found on other examples.

Control systems
Over close to 40 years, the control suite of the class has changed dramatically. The class was originally equipped with the Mk 113 mod 10 fire control system, also known as the Pargo display program. The Mk 113 runs on a UYK-7 computer.

The Mk 117 FCS, the first "all digital" fire control system, replaced the Mk 113. The Mk 117 transferred the duties of the analog Mk 75 attack director to the UYK-7, and the digital Mk 81 weapon control consoles, removing the two analog conversions, and allowing "all digital" control of the digital mk 48 control.

The Mark 1 Combat Control System/All Digital Attack Center replaced the Mk 117 FCS, on which it was based. The Mk 1 CCS was built by Lockheed Martin, and gave the class the ability to fire Tomahawk missiles. The CSS internal tracker model provides processing for both towed-array and spherical-array trackers. Trackers are signal followers that generate bearing, arrival angle, and frequency reports based on information received by an acoustic sensor. It incorporated the Gyro Static Navigator into the system in replacement of the DMINS of the earlier 688 class.

The Mk 1 CCS was replaced by the Mk 2, which was built by Raytheon. Mk 2 provides Tomahawk Block III vertical launch capability as well as fleet-requested improvements to Mk 48 ADCAP torpedo and Towed Array Target Motion Analysis operability. The Mk 2 CCS paired with the AN/BQQ-5E system is referred to as the QE-2" system. The CCS MK2 Block 1 A/B system architecture extends the CCS MK2 tactical system with a network of tactical advanced computers (TAC-3). These TAC-3s are configured to support the SFMPL, NTCS-A, LINK-11 and ATWCS subsystems.

Sensors

Sonar

AN/BQQ-5
AN/BQQ-5 sensor suite consists of the AN/BQS-13 spherical sonar array and AN/UYK-44 computer. The AN/BQQ-5 was developed from the AN/BQQ-2 sonar system. The BQS 11, 12, and 13 spherical arrays have 1,241 transducers. Also equipped are a conformal hull array with 104 to 156 hydrophones and two towed arrays: the TB-12 (later replaced by the TB-16) and TB-23 or TB-29, of which there are multiple variants. There are five versions of the AN/BQQ-5 system, sequentially identified by letters A–E.

The 688i (Improved) subclass was initially equipped with the AN/BSY-1 SUBACS submarine advanced combat system that used an AN/BQQ-5E sensor system with updated computers and interface equipment.

A series of conformal passive hydrophones are hard-mounted to each side of the hull, using the AN/BQR-24 internal processor. The system uses FLIT (frequency line integration tracking) which homes in on precise narrowband frequencies of sound and, using the Doppler principle, can accurately provide firing solutions against very quiet submarines. The AN/BQQ-5's hull array doubled the performance of its predecessors.

AN/BQQ-10
The AN/BQQ-5 system was replaced by the AN/BQQ-10 system. Acoustic Rapid Commercial Off-The-Shelf Insertion (A-RCI), designated AN/BQQ-10, is a four-phase program for transforming existing submarine sonar systems (AN/BSY-1, AN/BQQ-5, and AN/BQQ-6) from legacy systems to a more capable and flexible COTS/Open System Architecture (OSA) and also provide the submarine force with a common sonar system. A single A-RCI Multi-Purpose Processor (MPP) has as much computing power as the entire Los Angeles (SSN-688/688I) submarine fleet combined and will allow the development and use of complex algorithms previously beyond the reach of legacy processors. The use of COTS/OSA technologies and systems will enable rapid periodic updates to both software and hardware. COTS-based processors will allow computer power growth at a rate commensurate with the commercial industry.

Engineering and auxiliary systems

Two watertight compartments are used in the Los Angeles-class submarines. The forward compartment contains crew living spaces, weapons-handling spaces, and control spaces not critical to recovering propulsion. The aft compartment contains the bulk of the submarine's engineering systems, power generation turbines, and water-making equipment. Some submarines in the class are capable of delivering Navy SEALs through either a SEAL Delivery Vehicle deployed from the Dry Deck Shelter or the Advanced SEAL Delivery System mounted on the dorsal side, although the latter was cancelled in 2006 and removed from service in 2009. A variety of atmospheric control devices are used to allow the vessel to remain submerged for long periods of time without ventilating, including an electrolytic oxygen generator, which produces oxygen for the crew and hydrogen as a byproduct. The hydrogen is pumped overboard but there is always a risk of fire or explosion from this process.

While on the surface or at snorkel depth, the submarine may use the submarine's auxiliary or emergency diesel generator for power or ventilation (e.g., following a fire). The diesel engine in a 688 class can be quickly started by compressed air during emergencies or to evacuate noxious (nonvolatile) gases from the boat, although 'ventilation' requires raising a snorkel mast. During nonemergency situations, design constraints call for operators to allow the engine to reach normal operating temperatures before it is capable of producing full power, a process that may take from 20 to 30 minutes. However, the diesel generator can be immediately loaded to 100% power output, despite design criteria cautions, at the discretion of the submarine commander on the recommendation of the submarine's engineer, if necessity dictates such actions to: (a) restore electrical power to the submarine, (b) prevent a reactor incident from occurring or escalating, or (c) to protect the lives of the crew or others as determined necessary by the commanding officer.

Propulsion
The Los Angeles class is powered by the General Electric S6G pressurized water reactor. The hot reactor coolant water heats water in the steam generators, producing steam to power the propulsion turbines and ship service turbine generators (SSTGs), which generate the submarine's electrical power. The high-speed propulsion turbines drive the shaft and propeller through a reduction gear. In the case of a reactor plant casualty, the submarine has a diesel generator and a bank of batteries to provide electrical power. An emergency propulsion motor on the shaft line or a retractable 325-hp secondary propulsion motor power the submarine off the battery or diesel generator.

The S6G reactor plant was originally designed to use the D1G-2 core, similar to the D2G reactor used on the guided missile cruiser . The D1G-2 core had a rated thermal power of 150 MW and the turbines were rated at 30,000 shp. The D2W core is rated at 165 MW and turbine power rose to approximately 33,500 shp.

Boats in class

Summary by status

Submarines 

With a wide variance in longevity, 12 of the 688s were laid up halfway through their projected lifespans,  being the youngest-retired at 15 years, 11 months. Another five also laid up early (20–25 years), due to their midlife reactor refueling being cancelled, and one was lost during overhaul due to arson. All retired boats have been or will be scrapped per the Navy's Ship-Submarine Recycling Program. In addition, two— and —have been converted to moored training ships.

In popular culture

 Los Angeles-class submarines have been featured prominently in numerous Tom Clancy literary works and film adaptations, most notably  in The Hunt for Red October.
  was used in the 2008 made-for-television film Stargate: Continuum.
 688 Attack Sub, a 1989 MS-DOS submarine simulator, allowed the player to control a Los Angeles-class submarine during a set of Cold War missions. The game was also released for the Sega Genesis console.
 Jane's 688(i) Hunter/Killer, Sub Command, Dangerous Waters, developed by Sonalysts Inc., and Cold Waters by Killerfish Games, are video games where players control the 688i Los Angeles-class submarine.

See also

 List of Los Angeles-class submarines
 List of active Los Angeles-class submarines by homeport
 List of submarine classes of the United States Navy
 List of submarines of the United States Navy
 List of submarine classes in service
 Submarines in the United States Navy
 Cruise missile submarine
 Attack submarine

Notes

References

External links

 Role of the Modern Submarine at Submarine History.

Submarine classes
Naval ships of the United States
 
Cold War submarines of the United States